Luz del Rosario Saucedo Soto (born December 14, 1983) is a Mexican former football defender who played for the Mexico women's national football team.

Early life
Luz Saucedo was born in Canatlán, Mexico.

Playing career

Club

Portland Thorns FC
In January 2013, Saucedo was included in a list of 55 players from the U.S., Canada, and Mexico national teams that were allocated to the eight teams in the new National Women's Soccer League. She was allocated to Portland Thorns FC but was later removed by the Mexican Football Federation for unknown reasons.

International 
Saucedo represented Mexico at the FIFA U-19 Women's World Cup in Canada 2002), at the 2004 Summer Olympic Games in Athens, and at two Pan American Games in the Dominican Republic in 2003 and Rio de Janeiro in 2007.  She also was a member of the Mexico women's national football team at the 2011 FIFA Women's World Cup in Germany.

Personal
Saucedo's nickname is "Charito."

References

External links
 
 Portland Thorns player profile
 2015 FIFA Women's World Cup player profile

1983 births
Living people
Mexican women's footballers
Mexico women's international footballers
Footballers from Durango
Footballers at the 2011 Pan American Games
Olympic footballers of Mexico
Footballers at the 2004 Summer Olympics
2011 FIFA Women's World Cup players
FIFA Century Club
Women's association football defenders
Pan American Games medalists in football
Pan American Games bronze medalists for Mexico
Medalists at the 2011 Pan American Games
Mexican footballers